Henry Smyth, D.D. was a 17th-century priest and academic.

Smyth was educated at Trinity College, Cambridge; He was Master of Magdalene College, Cambridge from 1626 until 1642; and Vice-Chancellor of the University of Cambridge from 1626 until 1627. He was a Prebendary of Lincoln from 1611 until 1629; and then of Peterborough from then until his death in 1642.

References 

17th-century English Anglican priests
Alumni of Trinity College, Cambridge
Masters of Magdalene College, Cambridge
Vice-Chancellors of the University of Cambridge
1642 deaths